Mashhad Tarqi-ye Sofla (also Romanized as Mashāād Torqī-ye ‘Sofla, Mashhad Ţarqī-ye Soflá, and Mashāād Tarqī-ye ‘Sofla; also known as Mashhad Ţarqī and Mashhad Ţorqī-ye Pā’īn) is a village in Golian Rural District, in the Central District of Shirvan County, North Khorasan Province, Iran. At the 2006 census, its population was 383, in 98 families.

References 

Populated places in Shirvan County